Bernard Norman Gannon  (23 September 1952 – 4 January 2007), known as Ben Gannon, was an Australian film, television and stage producer.

Early life and education
Born Bernard Norman Gannon in Maffra in Victoria's Gippsland, his father was a land surveyor and farmer.

After schooling at Melbourne's Xavier College Lanbury House, Gannon graduated from the then production course of the National Institute of Dramatic Art in Sydney in 1970.

He was known as Ben.

Career
After graduation, Gannon worked at the Queensland Theatre Company, before stage-managing the original Australian production of Jesus Christ Superstar for Harry M. Miller Attractions. This was followed by eight years in London, where Gannon was company manager of Hair in the West End, and worked as a theatrical agent at the American Talent Agency, ICM, before forming his own talent agency, representing actors, writers, directors, and designers.

Gannon returned to Australia in 1980 and was appointed general manager of Associated R & R Films, the Robert Stigwood/Rupert Murdoch joint venture which produced the acclaimed film Gallipoli, of which he was associate producer. After forming his own production company, View Films, he produced two mini-series Shout! The Story of Johnny O'Keefe (starring Terry Serio) and Shadow of the Cobra (starring Rachel Ward and Art Malik).

He produced the award-winning films Travelling North (starring Leo McKern), Sweet Talker (starring Bryan Brown and Karen Allen), The Girl Who Came Late – also known as Daydream Believer – (starring Miranda Otto and Martin Kemp), Hammers Over the Anvil (starring Charlotte Rampling and Russell Crowe), and The Man Who Sued God (starring Billy Connolly and Judy Davis).

His film The Heartbreak Kid, based on the play by Richard Barrett, was the catalyst for his award-winning television series Heartbreak High. This proved to be one of Australia's most successful television exports ever, being sold to 80 countries, and eventually running to 210 hours.

Believing that there was a stage musical in the life and compositions of the Australian songwriter/performer Peter Allen after being alerted to him by Stephen MacLean, he commissioned a book to be written by Nick Enright, based on MacLean's earlier biography. Enright's version was published as Peter Allen: The Boy From Oz. He first produced a documentary of the same name for ABC Television, which aired in 1995.

In 1998 Gannon co-produced with London producer Robert Fox, Australia's highest-grossing theatre production The Boy from Oz, based on Enright's book and directed by Gale Edwards – which was successfully presented on Broadway, receiving a 2004 Tony Award nomination for Best Musical, and winning the Tony for Best Male Performer in a Musical for its star, Hugh Jackman.

Honours
Gannon was appointed an Officer of the Order of Australia (AO) in 2006 "For service to the performing arts as a producer contributing to the development of film, television, and theatre in Australia, and in promoting Australian productions and talented actors overseas, and to the community".

Death
He died of cancer, at home in Sydney on 4 January 2007, aged 54. He had been treated for cancer in 2003.

Selected filmography

Film
 Gallipoli (1981)
 The Heartbreak Kid (1993)
 Hammers over Anvil (1993)
 Daydream Believer (1992)
 Sweet Talker (1991)
 Travelling North (1987)

Television
Shout! The Story of Johnny O'Keefe

References

External links
 

1952 births
2007 deaths
Australian film producers
Officers of the Order of Australia
Deaths from cancer in New South Wales